{{DISPLAYTITLE:C8H8O}}
The molecular formula C8H8O (molar mass: 120.15 g/mol, exact mass: 120.057515 u) may refer to:

 Acetophenone
 Methylbenzaldehydes
 2-Methylbenzaldehyde
 3-Methylbenzaldehyde
 4-Methylbenzaldehyde
 Oxonine
 Phenylacetaldehyde
 Phthalane
 Styrene oxide
 4-Vinylphenol

Molecular formulas